Pyrausta perrubralis is a moth in the family Crambidae. It was described by Packard in 1873. It is found in North America, where it has been recorded from British Columbia, California, New Mexico, Oregon and Washington.

The forewings are deep ochreous-yellow with bright red scales. The hindwings are whitish with a small black discal spot. Adults have been recorded on wing from April to October.

Subspecies
Pyrausta perrubralis perrubralis
Pyrausta perrubralis saanichalis Munroe, 1951 (British Columbia)
Pyrausta perrubralis shastanalis Munroe, 1976 (California)

References

Moths described in 1873
perrubralis
Moths of North America